Carbohydrate chemistry is a subdiscipline of chemistry primarily concerned with the detection, synthesis, structure, and function of carbohydrates. Due to the general structure of carbohydrates, their synthesis is often preoccupied with the selective formation of glycosidic linkages and the selective reaction of hydroxyl groups; as a result, it relies heavily on the use of protecting groups.

Monosaccharides

Individual saccharide residues are termed monosaccharides.

Carbohydrate synthesis

Carbohydrate synthesis is a sub-field of organic chemistry concerned specifically with the generation of natural and unnatural carbohydrate structures. This can include the synthesis of monosaccharide residues or structures containing more than one monosaccharide, known as oligosaccharides.

Glycosidic bond formation
 Chemical glycosylation
 Fischer glycosidation
 Glycosyl halide
 Koenigs-Knorr reaction

Protecting groups
 Carbohydrate acetalisation
 Trimethylsilyl
 Benzyl Ether
 para-methoxybenzyl ether

Oligosaccharides

Reactions of carbohydrates
Carbohydrates are reactants in many organic reactions. For example:
 Cyanohydrin reaction
 Lobry-de Bruyn-van Ekenstein transformation
 Amadori rearrangement
 Nef reaction
 Wohl degradation
 Tipson-Cohen reaction
 Ferrier rearrangement
 Ferrier II reaction

Functions of carbohydrates
Carbohydrates have four major functions within the body:

 Energy supply, particularly for the brain in the form of glucose
 Avoiding the breakdown of amino acids for energy
 Avoiding ketosis from the breakdown of fatty acids
 Cellular and protein recognition

Energy supply, particularly for the brain in the form of glucose

Avoiding the breakdown of amino acids for energy

Avoiding ketosis from the breakdown of fatty acids

Cellular and protein recognition

Glycoprotein hormones may be removed by the liver from the bloodstream when the passage of time causes the breaking-off of carbohydrates from the glycoproteins.

See also

Carbohydrate structure
 Anomeric effect
 Carbohydrate
 Carbohydrate conformation
 Disaccharide
 Glycosidic bond
 Monosaccharide
 Polysaccharide

Carbohydrate function and biology
 Glycobiology
 Glycomics
 Glycosylation
 Organic synthesis

References

External links

Functions of Carbohydrates

 
Carbohydrates
Chemical synthesis